The eleventh season of the Bleach anime series, released on DVD as , is directed by Noriyuki Abe, and produced by TV Tokyo, Dentsu and Studio Pierrot. The seven episode season is based on Tite Kubo's Bleach manga series. The episodes' plot follows the flashback arc of the series' storyline which retells the Vizard's past.

The season aired from February 10 to March 24, 2009, on TV Tokyo. The English adaptation of the anime is licensed by Viz Media, which aired on Cartoon Network's Adult Swim from May 29 to July 10, 2011. Aniplex collected the season in a series of two DVD compilations. The first DVD volume was released on November 26, 2009, and the second on December 16 of the same year.

The episodes use two pieces of theme music: one opening theme and one closing theme.


Episode list

References
General

Specific

2009 Japanese television seasons
Season 11